The ARIA Albums Chart ranks the best-performing albums and extended plays (EPs) in Australia. Its data, published by the Australian Recording Industry Association, is based collectively on the weekly physical and digital sales of albums and EPs. In 2017, 24 albums claimed the top spot, including Michael Bublé's Christmas, and seven acts, The xx, Dune Rats, Busby Marou, The Waifs, Harry Styles, Paul Kelly and Gang of Youths, achieved their first number-one album in Australia.

Chart history

Number-one artists

See also
2017 in music
List of number-one singles of 2017 (Australia)
List of top 10 albums in 2017 (Australia)

References

2017
Australia albums
Number-one albums